High Raise, may refer to a number of hills in England:

High Raise (High Street) – 802 m peak in the east of the Lake District
High Raise (Langdale) – 762 m peak in the centre of the Lake District